Steve Refenes, also known as Stavros Refenes (born 19 February 1970) is an Australian former professional soccer player who played as a midfielder.

Career
Refenes played club football in Australia for Sydney Olympic and Sydney United, and in Greece for Olympiacos, Panionios and Panelefsiniakos.

Refenes also competed at the 1992 Summer Olympics, making four appearances in the tournament.

Personal life
Refenes is an Australian of Greek descent.

References

1970 births
Living people
Australian soccer players
Australian expatriate soccer players
National Soccer League (Australia) players
Footballers at the 1992 Summer Olympics
Olympic soccer players of Australia
Sydney Olympic FC players
Sydney United 58 FC players
Panelefsiniakos F.C. players
Olympiacos F.C. players
Australian expatriate sportspeople in Greece
Expatriate footballers in Greece
Association football midfielders
Panionios F.C. players
Super League Greece players
Australian people of Greek descent